Benzoquinonetetracarboxylic dianhydride is an organic compound with formula  (an oxide of carbon) which can be seen as the result of removing two molecules of water  from benzoquinonetetracarboxylic acid.

It is a red solid, stable in dry air up to 140 °C and insoluble in ether, carbon tetrachloride, dichloromethane, and carbon disulfide.  It reacts with acetone, ethyl acetate, tetrahydrofuran, ethanol, and water.  It dissolves in methylated derivatives of benzene to give solutions ranging from orange to violet. When the molecule is exposed to moist air, it quickly turns blue.

The compound was synthesized in 1963 by P. R. Hammond, who claimed it was "one of
the strongest π-electron acceptors so far described."

See also
 Ethylenetetracarboxylic dianhydride
 Tetrahydroxy-1,4-benzoquinone biscarbonate
 Tetrahydroxy-1,4-benzoquinone bisoxalate

References

Oxocarbons
1,4-Benzoquinones
Phthalic anhydrides
Heterocyclic compounds with 3 rings